Apichet Kittikorncharoen (name later changed to Panrawat, 2 December 1982 – 9 December 2007) was a Thai singer known under the stage name Big D2B. He studied film at Bangkok University and was part of RS Promotion's trio boy band D2B.

On 22 July 2003, a car accident in which he fell into a polluted Bangkok khlong (canal) resulted in severe brain infection with multiple organisms including the Pseudallescheria boydii fungus, which, despite efforts to treat him including four brain operations and medicine flown in from Australia, caused extensive damage to his brain. He remained in coma for four years before finally succumbing to the illness. Apichet's case, which saw throngs of fans hoping and praying for him at the hospital as well as intense media attention, helped raise awareness about the hazardous nature of Bangkok's water pollution. His funeral was held for 100 days from the end of 2007 to March of the next year, and was patronised by Queen Sirikit.

Post-D2B era

Big’s brain disease in 2004 have made the renaming of “D2B” to “Dan-Beam” in 2005 because Worrawech Danuwong (Dan) and Kawee Tanjararak (Beam) was active during that period until it was disbanded in 2007 following Big’s death, and D2B is no more.

References

Apichet Kittikorncharoen
1982 births
2007 deaths
Apichet Kittikorncharoen
Infectious disease deaths in Thailand